Zlatka Georgieva (born 20 July 1969) is a retired Bulgarian sprinter who specialized in the women's 200 metres.

Achievements

External links

1969 births
Living people
Bulgarian female sprinters
Athletes (track and field) at the 1996 Summer Olympics
Olympic athletes of Bulgaria
Universiade medalists in athletics (track and field)
Universiade bronze medalists for Bulgaria
Medalists at the 1995 Summer Universiade
Olympic female sprinters
20th-century Bulgarian women
21st-century Bulgarian women